Mohamed Hakim (born 7 July 1987) is a Tunisian football midfielder.

References

1987 births
Living people
Tunisian footballers
AS Kasserine players
EGS Gafsa players
AS Gabès players
Olympique Béja players
ES Métlaoui players
Association football midfielders
Tunisian Ligue Professionnelle 1 players